Deep Core can refer to:

 Deep Core (video game)
 a region in the Star Wars galaxy
 DeepCore a complementary extension to IceCube Neutrino Observatory
 Deep Core, a 2000 science fiction film